2091 is a Colombian television Science fiction action series created by Andrés Gelós for Fox Latin America. The series premiered on October 18, 2016 and consists of 12 episodes. The series was recorded entirely in Colombia, in locations including the capital city Bogotá and the city of Neiva and the Tatacoa Desert in Huila Department.

The series was produced by Fox Telecolombia and was directed by Felipe Martínez Amador and Álvaro Curiel. Full 3D CGI animation was used to create special effects for the futuristic cities, spaceships and planets.

The plot takes place 75 years in the future, where humanity's behavior has exhausted the planet's resources, forcing its inhabitants to look for alternatives to ensure their survival.

Synopsis 
Seven New Manaus gamers are recruited by the Neodymium Corporation to carry out an extreme game on the terraformed moon of Callisto. On board the Colonus, which is a spaceship, a game console, mother and father at the same time, they compete with each other for glory and privilege in Destiny City. However, everything changes when Ferrán (Manolo Cardona), the oldest player, discovers the sinister truth hidden in the game.

Cast 

 Manolo Cardona as Ferrán
 Benjamín Vicuña as Lodi
 Angie Cepeda as Lila
 Ludovico Di Santo as Mefisto
 Luz Cipriota as Altea
  as Kim/Gaspar
 Jean Paul Leroux as Reznik
 Damián Alcázar as el Sr. Patrick Hull
 Christopher Von Uckermann as Inpar/Derik Hull
  as Vera
 Cristina Rodlo as Enira/Lua
 Salvador del Solar as Gorlero
  as Kore
  as Mr. Park
 Geraldine Zivic as la Doctora Yun
  as Almorás / Dr. Astor Sharma
  as Lorent
 Jason Day as Lutar
 Tim Janssen as Pok
 Natalia Reyes as Roda
 Flora Martínez as Sonia (wife of Enrique Bogarin) / S.O.N.I.A (artificial intelligence)
 Angely Gaviria as Ina

Episodes

Production

Development 
The series was created by Andrés Gelós, who also created  and Cumbia Ninja. Edgar Spielmann, COO of FOX Networks Group Latin America, stated that "The completion of Cumbia Ninja last year provided us with the experience and direction necessary to develop a project of this magnitude. 2091 is definitely our most ambitious production in terms of post production, where between 70% and 80% of each episode is mixed with visual effects and the total post-production process of the series extends up to a year."

Filming 
The series began filming in April 2016 in Colombia, specifically in the cities of Bogota, the desert of Tatacoa and Neiva. The first season ended in July 2016.

Marketing 
On July 1, 2016, the Fox Latin America channel launched the first teaser of the series, which shows different newspaper headlines with dates between 2016 and 2091. Most of the headlines talk about the power that video games have taken with the passing of years.

The second teaser was released on August 13, 2016, showing the series logo alongside fragments of dystopian images and police. Ten days later the first promotional advance of the series was launched, in which the protagonists describe 2091 with different synonyms and made a countdown until the premiere.

References

External links
 

2016 Colombian television series debuts
2017 Colombian television series endings
Television shows set in Colombia